William Edwin Lee (January 8, 1852 – November 16, 1920) was a Minnesota politician and Speaker of the Minnesota House of Representatives. He first served in the Minnesota House of Representatives from 1885 to 1889, and was sent back to the body from 1893 to 1895. He was elected Speaker during his second tenure in office.

Biography
William E. Lee was born in Alton, Illinois on January 8, 1852.

He died from liver cancer at his home in Long Prairie, Minnesota on November 16, 1920.

References

  	

1852 births
1920 deaths
People from Alton, Illinois
People from Long Prairie, Minnesota
Businesspeople from Minnesota
Republican Party members of the Minnesota House of Representatives
Speakers of the Minnesota House of Representatives